The 1980–81 Indiana Hoosiers men's basketball team represented Indiana University. Their head coach was Bobby Knight, who was in his 10th year. The team played its home games in Assembly Hall in Bloomington, Indiana, and was a member of the Big Ten Conference.

The Hoosiers finished the regular season with an overall record of 26–9 and a conference record of 14–4, finishing 1st in the Big Ten Conference. As Big Ten Conference Champions, IU was invited to participate in the 1981 NCAA Tournament as a 3-seed; the Hoosiers advanced to the championship game where Bobby Knight and the Hoosiers won their fourth national title.

Roster

Schedule/Results

|-
!colspan=8 style=| Regular Season
|-

|-
!colspan=8 style=| NCAA Tournament

Awards and honors
Bob Knight, Big Ten Coach of the Year
 Isiah Thomas, NCAA Men's MOP Award
Ray Tolbert, Big Ten Player of the Year

Team players drafted into the NBA

Notes
 This was guard Isiah Thomas' sophomore season.  Fresh off a national championship and the 1981 NCAA men's basketball tournament MVP, Thomas declared early for the 1981 NBA draft and was selected #2 overall by the Detroit Pistons.
 On July 25, 1981, forward Landon Turner was injured in a car crash and suffered a fractured spine and paralysis in both legs.

References

Indiana Hoosiers men's basketball seasons
Indiana
NCAA Division I men's basketball tournament championship seasons
NCAA Division I men's basketball tournament Final Four seasons
Indiana
1980 in sports in Indiana
1981 in sports in Indiana